Gordon Young may refer to:
 Gordon Young (artist), British artist
 Gordon Young (composer) (1919–1998), American organist and composer
 Gordon Young (writer) (1886–1948), American writer of adventure and western stories
 Gordon Elmo Young (1907–1969), United States federal judge
 Gordon Young (journalist), American journalist, author and educator